The Museum of the Strauss Dynasty (Strauss Museum) in Vienna is a museum dedicated to the Strauss family: Johann I, Johann II, Josef, Eduard and Johann III.

Museum 
The Museum of the Strauss Dynasty was founded by the private association Kulturverein Wiener Blut and presents many items from the collection of the association, as well as items loaned by the Strauss family and others. Following a special preview evening on 15 March 2015, it was opened to the general public on 18 March.

Across seven rooms, visitors can learn biographical detail of all members of the Strauss family, as well as the historical and sociological background of Vienna in the 19th century. "Listening stations" in each room permit the visitor to hear pieces of music relevant to the information displayed.

The museum is located at Müllnergasse 3, A-1090 Vienna.

Gallery

See also 
 List of music museums

References

External links 

 

Museum
Music museums in Austria
Art museums and galleries in Vienna
Museums in Vienna
History museums in Austria
Buildings and structures in Alsergrund
Museums established in 2015
2015 establishments in Austria
21st-century architecture in Austria